Nzinga-a-Nkuwu João I (né Nzinga-a-Nkuwu), was the 5th ManiKongo of the Kingdom of Kongo (Kongo-dia-Ntotila in Kikongo language) between 1470 and 1509. He voluntarily converted to Roman Catholicism. He was baptized on 3 May 1491 and took the Christian name of João. Soon after, ManiKongo Nzinga-a-Nkuwu João I abandoned the new faith for a number of reasons, one of them being the Roman Catholic Church requirement of monogamy. Politically, the king could not afford to abandon polygamy and embrace monogamy, a cultural shift that the king could not contemplate as power in Kongo was elective, rather than hereditary as in Europe. Kongo culture followed a matrilineality structure, where the elder son of the king is not automatically the next king.

Early reign
King Nzinga-a-Nkuwu was the fifth ruler of Kongo. He was married to Queen Nzinga a Nlaza, a first cousin. She had a son by the king named Nzinga Mbemba. She would later help him become king of Kongo after her husband's death. Under the reign of Nzinga a Nkuwu, Kongo had grown to 100,000 square kilometers and contained a very centralized government.

Arrival of the Portuguese
In 1483, a Portuguese caravel captained by Diogo Cão reached the estuary of the Congo River and made contact with subjects of the king. Cão sailed back to Portugal carrying a party of Kongo emissaries. On arrival in Lisbon, the emissaries were baptized and placed in a monastery before returning to the king in 1491.

Along with the emissaries came Portuguese priests, masons, carpenters and soldiers plus European goods. The ships anchored at Mpinda and after a brief halt to baptise the governor of Soyo, uncle to the manikongo, the procession went on to the capital where they were greeted by the king and five of his leading nobles.

Baptisms and later relations
On 3 May 1491, the king of Kongo was baptised along with his family. Initially, only the king and his nobles were to be converted, but the queen demanded to be baptised. Kongo's royal family took the names of their Portuguese counterparts, thus João, Leonor (or Leanor in some instances) and Afonso. A thousand subjects were detailed to help the Portuguese carpenters build a church, meanwhile, the Portuguese soldiers accompanied the king in a campaign to defend the province of Nsundi from Bateke raiders. The European firearms were decisive in the victory and many captives were taken.

Later life
Most of the Portuguese later departed with slaves and ivory while leaving behind priests and craftsmen. After this cultural honeymoon, the king's profession of the Catholic faith proved short-lived. He died in 1509. He was succeeded by his son Afonso I via the Queen Nzinga a Nlaza.

See also
List of rulers of Kongo
History of Angola
Nzinga of Ndongo and Matamba

References

1470 births
1509 deaths
Manikongo of Kongo
Converts to Roman Catholicism from pagan religions
Kongolese royalty
15th-century monarchs in Africa
16th-century monarchs in Africa